Vasif Dervish Biçaku (22 March 1922 – 23 September 1979) was an Albanian footballer who played for Sportklub Tiranë and Apolonia Fier as well as the Albania national team. He is also known for being part of the 1946 Albania vs Yugoslavia football match, which was Albania's first official match. In total, he earned 18 caps for the national team between 1946 and 1952.

Club career
Biçaku was born in Tiranë into a noble family from Elbasan and began his football career in the late 1930s with Sportklub Tiranë. He moved to Partizani Tirana in 1948 where he won two National Championships. Towards the end of his playing career he moved to Apolonia Fier and played in the Albanian second tier until his retirement in the mid 1950s.

International career
Biçaku made his debut for Albania in an August 1946 friendly match against Montenegro and earned a total of 17 caps, scoring 1 goal. His final international was a June 1950 friendly match against Bulgaria.

Personal life and death
Biçaku was a notable fighter for the Albanian Partisans and was involved in the liberation movement. He was a staunch communist and even refused to meet with his own father in Rome, Italy where he was in exile for opposing the communist regime.

Biçaku died on 23 September 1979, at the age of 57.

Honours
Kategoria Superiore: 2
 1948, 1949

References

External links

1922 births
1979 deaths
Footballers from Tirana
Albanian footballers
Association football midfielders
Albania international footballers
Kategoria Superiore players
KF Tirana players
FK Partizani Tirana players
KF Apolonia Fier players
Albanian football managers
KF Apolonia Fier managers
Albanian communists